Ishtam is a 2012 Indian Tamil-language romance film directed by Prem Nizar, starring Vimal and Nisha Aggarwal. A remake of the Telugu film Yemaindi Ee Vela (2010), it was released on 25 May 2012.

Plot
Saravanan is a modern city guy while Sandhya is a village modern girl who came to the city to find a job. Sandhya and Saravanan first meet while going to an interview. At first, they had some disagreements and fought. Then, the friendship blossomed into love and they had a relationship. They decided to marry and their parents did not agree to this, but they were married anyway and started to live happily at Saravanan's place. They were happy for a few months, but they did start to disagree and fight, so they decided to divorce. Both of them went to their parents house to live separately. Their parents decided to get them a new partner. At first they agreed with their parents decision. But then the love between Sandhya and Saravanan is rekindled since they miss each other. They decided to cancel their second marriage and live together happily.

Cast

 Vimal as Saravanan
 Nisha Aggarwal as Sandhya
 Santhanam as Thiyagu
 Parvati Nibran as Nimisha
 Anoop Kumar as Akash
 Pragathi as Saravanan's mother
 Uma Padmanabhan as Sandhya's mother
 Yuvarani as Sandhya's aunt
 Misha Ghoshal as Sandhya's friend
 Charle as Watchman
 Karate Raja as Shankar
 Namo Narayana
 Swaminathan

Production
Yemaindi Ee Vela'''s remake rights were bought by Balaji Real Media and newcomer Prem Nizar, an erstwhile assistant of director Chakri Toleti was chosen as the director. Ishtam marks an makeover for Vimal, who played a rural youngster in films like Pasanga, Kalavani and Eththan'', featuring him as a "modern, city-based man". Kajal Aggarwal's sister Nisha Aggarwal, who played the female lead in the original, was signed to reprise her role, making her debut in Tamil cinema. The film was launched by mid-August 2011, and filming was completed by late September 2011 in a single schedule.

Soundtrack
The music is composed by S. Thaman who composed the original film. "Oru Megam" and "Dhinnaku Dhin" were reused from Thaman's own compositions from Telugu film Mirapakaay and Kick .

References

2012 directorial debut films
Tamil remakes of Telugu films
2012 films
2010s Tamil-language films
Films scored by Thaman S